Mikaile Tmušić (Cyrillic: Микаиле Тмушић, ; born 6 January 1993) is a Kosovan professional basketball player for Trepça of the Kosovo Basketball Superleague and Liga Unike. He also plays for the Kosovan national basketball team.

Honours 

Kosovo Basketball Superleague
Winners (3): 2018, 2019, 2022

Kosovo Cup
Winners (2): 2019, 2023

Liga Unike Supercup
Winners (2): 2021, 2022

References 

1993 births
People from Peja
Kosovan people of Montenegrin descent
KK Lovćen players
KB Prishtina players
KK Podgorica players
Kosovan basketball players
Living people

KB Ylli players